A velouté sauce is a savory sauce that is made from a roux and a light stock. It is one of the "mother sauces" of French cuisine listed by chef Auguste Escoffier in the early twentieth century, along with  espagnole, tomato, béchamel, and mayonnaise or hollandaise. Velouté is  French for 'velvety'.

In preparing a velouté sauce, a light stock (one in which the bones of the base used have not been roasted previously), such as veal, chicken, or fish stock, is thickened with a blond roux. The sauce produced is commonly referred to by the type of stock used (e.g. chicken velouté, fish velouté, seafood velouté).

Derived sauces

Sauce velouté often is served on poultry or seafood dishes and is also used as the base for other sauces. 

Sauces derived from a velouté sauce include:
Albufera sauce: with addition of meat glaze, or glace de viande
Allemande sauce: by adding a few drops of lemon juice, egg yolks, and cream
Aurore: tomato purée
Sauce bercy: shallots, white wine, lemon juice, and parsley added to a fish velouté
Hungarian: onion, paprika, white wine
 Normande sauce: prepared with velouté or fish velouté, cream, butter, and egg yolk as primary ingredients; some versions may use mushroom cooking liquid and oyster liquid or fish fumet added to fish velouté, finished with a liaison of egg yolks and cream.
Poulette: mushrooms finished with chopped parsley and lemon juice
Sauce à la polonaise ("Polish-style"): sauce velouté mixed with horseradish, lemon juice, and sour cream (different from Polonaise garnish)
Sauce ravigote: the addition of a little lemon or white wine vinegar creates a lightly acidic velouté that traditionally is flavored with onions and shallots, and more recently with mustard. 
Sauce vin blanc: has the addition of fish trim, egg yolks, and butter and, typically, it is served with fish.
Suprême sauce: by adding a reduction of mushroom liquor (produced in cooking) and cream to a chicken velouté 
Venetian sauce: tarragon, shallots, chervil
Wine sauce: such as white wine sauce and champagne sauce

See also

 List of sauces

References 

French sauces
White sauces
Mother sauces